Einar Erici (1885–1965) was a Swedish doctor, researcher of musical organs and amateur photographer. He worked at a tuberculosis hospital in Stockholm and ran a private medical practice. He became an expert on church organs and organ builders. He conducted archive investigation on the topic and established an inventory of Swedish organs from before 1850. His collection of photographs of church organs has been archived as well as his photographs of people in nature, or at work.

Awards 

 1947 - Corresponding member of the Royal Danish History of History and the Antiquity Academy
 1950 - Associate no. 199 by the Royal Academy of Music
 1959 - The Medal for the Tone Art Promotion
 1962 - Philosophy of Honorary Doctor at Uppsala University

References 

1885 births
1965 deaths
Date of birth missing
Place of birth missing
Date of death missing
Place of death missing
20th-century Swedish physicians
20th-century Swedish photographers